Yo-Yo Ma (born October 7, 1955) is an American cellist. Born and partially raised in Paris to Chinese parents and educated in New York City, he was a child prodigy, performing from the age of four and a half. He graduated from the Juilliard School and Harvard University and attended Columbia University and has performed as a soloist with orchestras around the world. He has recorded more than 90 albums and received 19 Grammy Awards.

In addition to recordings of the standard classical repertoire, Ma has recorded a wide variety of folk music, such as American bluegrass music, traditional Chinese melodies, the tangos of Argentine composer Astor Piazzolla, and Brazilian music. He has collaborated with artists in diverse genres, including the singer Bobby McFerrin, the guitarist Carlos Santana, Sérgio Assad and his brother, Odair, and the singer-songwriter-guitarist James Taylor. Ma's primary performance instrument is a 1733 Montagnana cello.

Ma has been a United Nations Messenger of Peace since 2006. He was awarded The Glenn Gould Prize in 1999, the National Medal of Arts in 2001, the Presidential Medal of Freedom in 2011, and the Polar Music Prize in 2012. Ma was named one of Times 100 Most Influential People of 2020.

Early life and education
Ma's mother, Marina Lu, was a singer, and his father, Hiao-Tsiun Ma, was a violinist, composer and professor of music at Nanjing National Central University (now relocated in Taoyuan, Taiwan; predecessor of the present-day Nanjing University and Southeast University). They both migrated from the Republic of China to France during the Chinese Civil War. Ma's sister, Yeou-Cheng Ma, played the violin and piano before obtaining a medical degree and becoming a pediatrician. The family moved to New York City when Ma was seven.

From the age of three, Ma played the drums, violin, piano, and later viola, but settled on the cello in 1960 at age four. When three-year-old Yo-Yo said he wanted a big instrument, his father went to see Etienne Vatelot, a foremost violin maker in Paris who, after a chat, lent him a 1/16th cello. He jokes that his first choice was the double bass due to its large size, but he compromised and took up cello instead. When Dr Ma realised that Yo-Yo was ready for a better teacher, a well-known cello instructor, Mme Michelle Lepinte, was selected. He began performing before audiences at age five and played for presidents Dwight D. Eisenhower and John F. Kennedy when he was seven. At age eight, he appeared on American television with his sister in an event introduced by Leonard Bernstein. In 1964, Isaac Stern introduced them on The Tonight Show Starring Johnny Carson, and they performed the Sonata of Sammartini. He attended Trinity School in New York but transferred to the Professional Children's School, where he graduated at age 15. He appeared as a soloist with the Harvard Radcliffe Orchestra in a performance of Tchaikovsky's Rococo Variations.

Ma studied at the Juilliard School at age 19 with Leonard Rose and attended Columbia University, but dropped out. He later enrolled at Harvard College. Prior to entering Harvard, Ma played in the Marlboro Festival Orchestra under the direction of cellist and conductor Pablo Casals. He spent four summers at the Marlboro Music Festival after meeting and falling in love with Mount Holyoke College sophomore and festival administrator Jill Hornor during his first summer there in 1972.

Even before that time, Ma gained fame and performed with many of the world's major orchestras. He has also played chamber music, often with pianist Emanuel Ax, with whom he has a close friendship from their days at Juilliard. Ma received his bachelor's degree in anthropology from Harvard in 1976, and in 1991 received an honorary doctorate from Harvard.

Career

In 1997, Ma was featured on John Williams' soundtrack to the Hollywood film Seven Years in Tibet. In 2000, he was heard on the soundtrack of Crouching Tiger, Hidden Dragon, and of Master and Commander: The Far Side of the World in 2003. He collaborated with Williams again on the score for the 2005 film Memoirs of a Geisha. He has also worked with Italian composer Ennio Morricone and has recorded Morricone's compositions of the Dollars Trilogy, including The Good, the Bad and the Ugly, as well as Once Upon a Time in America, The Mission, and The Untouchables. He has recorded over 90 albums, 19 of which are Grammy Award winners. He received the Award of Excellence from New York's International Center.

In addition to his prolific musical career, Ma collaborated in 1999 with landscape architects to design a Bach-inspired garden. Known as the Music Garden, it interprets Bach's Suite No. 1 in G Major for unaccompanied cello (BWV 1007), where the garden's sections were designed to correspond with the suite's dance movements. Toronto enthusiastically embraced the design, originally planned for Boston, and it was subsequently built in the Harbourfront neighborhood.

Ma was named Peace Ambassador by then-UN Secretary-General Kofi Annan in January 2006. He is a founding member of the influential Chinese-American Committee of 100, which addresses the concerns of Americans of Chinese heritage.

On November 3, 2009, President Barack Obama appointed Ma to serve on the President's Committee on the Arts and Humanities. His music was featured in the 2010 documentary Jews and Baseball: An American Love Story, narrated by Academy Award winner Dustin Hoffman. In 2010, President Obama announced that he would recognize Ma with the Presidential Medal of Freedom, which Ma received in February 2011.

In 2010, Ma was named Judson and Joyce Green Creative Consultant of the Chicago Symphony Orchestra. He launched the Citizen Musician initiative partnership in partnership with the orchestra's music director, Riccardo Muti. Also in 2010, he appeared on a solo album by guitarist Carlos Santana, Guitar Heaven: The Greatest Guitar Classics of All Time, playing alongside Santana and singer India Arie on a Beatles classic, While My Guitar Gently Weeps.

In 2015, Ma performed with singer-songwriter and guitarist James Taylor on three tracks of Taylor's chart-topping album Before This World: You And I Again. In 2019, Ma directed the orchestra at the annual Youth Music Culture Guangdong. Ma is represented by the independent artist management firm Opus 3 Artists. Ma contributed to the charity tribute album The Metallica Blacklist, released in September 2021, by backing Miley Cyrus on a cover of the Metallica song "Nothing Else Matters".

Silk Road Ensemble

Ma formed his own collective, the Silk Road Ensemble, named after the route across Asia which for more than 2,000 years was used for trade between Europe and China. His goal was to bring together musicians from diverse countries that were historically linked via the Silk Road. The ensemble's recordings are issued on the Sony Classical label. He also founded the Silk Road Connect, an educational pilot program for children from middle schools in the United States, including New York City.

Playing style
Ma has been referred to by critics as "omnivorous" and possesses an eclectic repertoire. In addition to numerous recordings of the standard classical repertoire, he has recorded Baroque pieces using period instruments; American bluegrass music; traditional Chinese melodies, including the soundtrack to the film Crouching Tiger, Hidden Dragon; the tangos of Argentinian composer Astor Piazzolla; Brazilian music, recording traditional and contemporary songs composed by Antônio Carlos Jobim and Pixinguinha; a collaboration with Bobby McFerrin (where Ma admitted to being terrified by McFerrin's improvisation); and the music of modern minimalist Philip Glass, in such works as the 2002 Naqoyqatsi.

Ma is known for his smooth, rich tone, soulful lyricism and virtuosity. He released a cello recording of Niccolò Paganini's Caprice No. 24 for solo violin and Zoltán Kodály's Solo Sonata.

Instruments
Ma's primary performance instrument is "Petunia", a 1733 Domenico Montagnana cello valued in 2005 at US$2.5 million (US$ million in  prices). A student approached Ma after one of his classes in Salt Lake City and asked if the cello had a nickname. Ma replied, "No, but if I play for you, will you name it?" The student chose Petunia, and it stuck. In 1999, Ma inadvertently left the cello in a taxicab in New York City, but it was quickly returned undamaged. That year, when its neck was damaged during X-ray baggage inspection, he borrowed the Pawle Stradivarius cello from the Chimei Museum for a concert in Taiwan. The damage was repaired in time, but Ma played both Petunia and Pawle in the concert nonetheless.

Another of Ma's cellos, the Davidov Stradivarius, was previously owned by Jacqueline du Pré, who bequeathed it to him. Du Pré voiced her frustration with the cello's "unpredictability", but Ma attributed du Pré's sentiment to her impassioned style of playing, adding that the Stradivarius cello must be "coaxed" by the player. It was until recently set up in a Baroque manner, since Ma exclusively played Baroque music on it.

Ma also owns a modern cello made by Peter and Wendela Moes of Peißenberg, Germany, and one of carbon fiber by the Luis and Clark company of Boston. Ma also plays on a Zygmuntowicz cello, which he takes on long tours and uses in major concert venues. According to Zygmuntowicz, he "wants to give [Ma] a reason to leave his Montagnana at home."

Live performances
 On July 5, 1986, Ma performed in the New York Philharmonic's tribute to the 100th anniversary of the Statue of Liberty, which was televised live on ABC Television. The orchestra, with conductor Zubin Mehta, performed in Central Park.

Ma performed a duet with Condoleezza Rice at the presentation of the 2001 National Medal of Arts and National Humanities Medal Awards. He was the first performer on September 11, 2002 at the site of the World Trade Center, while the first of the names of the dead were read on the first anniversary of the attack on the WTC; he played the Sarabande from Bach's Cello Suite #5 in C Minor. He performed a special arrangement of Sting's "Fragile" with Sting and the Mormon Tabernacle Choir in the opening ceremonies of the 2002 Winter Olympics in Salt Lake City, Utah. He also appeared as a Pennington Great Performers series artist with the Baton Rouge Symphony Orchestra in 2005.

He performed John Williams' "Air and Simple Gifts" at the inauguration ceremony for Barack Obama on January 20, 2009, along with Itzhak Perlman (violin), Gabriela Montero (piano), and Anthony McGill (clarinet). While the quartet played live, the music, played simultaneously over speakers and on television, was a recording made two days prior due to concerns over the cold weather damaging the instruments. Ma said, "A broken string was not an option. It was wicked cold."

On May 3, 2009, Ma performed the world premiere of Bruce Adolphe's "Self Comes to Mind" for solo cello and two percussionists with John Ferrari and Ayano Kataoka at the American Museum of Natural History in New York City. The work is based on a poetic description written for the composer of the evolution of brain into mind by neuroscientist Antonio Damasio. A film of brain scans provided by Hanna Damasio, and other images, were coordinated with the performance.

On August 29, 2009, Ma performed at the funeral mass for Senator Edward M. Kennedy. Pieces he performed included the Sarabande movement from Bach's Cello Suite No. 6 and Franck's Panis angelicus with Plácido Domingo.

On October 3, 2009, Ma appeared with Canadian prime minister Stephen Harper at the National Arts Centre gala in Ottawa. Harper, a fan of The Beatles, played the piano and sang a rendition of "With a Little Help from My Friends" while Ma accompanied him on cello. On October 16, 2011, Ma performed at the memorial of Steve Jobs at Stanford University's Memorial Church.

In 2011, Ma performed with American dancer Charles "Lil Buck" Riley in the United States and in China at the U.S.-China Forum on the Arts and Culture.

On April 18, 2013, he performed at an interfaith service to honor the victims of the Boston Marathon bombing, held at the Cathedral of the Holy Cross, where he played the Sarabande from Bach's Cello Suite No. 5 in C Minor. He and other musicians also accompanied members of the Boston Children's Chorus in a hymn.

On September 9, 2015, Ma performed all six of Bach's cello suites at the Royal Albert Hall (London) as part of the BBC Proms Season.

On September 12, 2017, Ma performed all six of Bach's cello suites at the Hollywood Bowl (Los Angeles). After the first three suites, there was a "ten-minute pause" (as the Bowl video screen described it). The audience of around 17,000 also heard him play an encore, a tribute to "cellist Pablo Casals, who as a 13-year-old in 1890 discovered an old copy of the Bach suites in a secondhand music store, bringing them to modern attention. Ma's memorable last words were, "If there are any 13-year-here—don't throw anything away."

On November 11, 2018, Ma performed at the Arc de Triomphe in Paris, with violinist Renaud Capuçon, in front of a crowd of world leaders during a ceremony marking the 100th anniversary of the end of World War I.

On May 1, 2019, he performed at Paranal Observatory in the Atacama desert. He said that his interest in astronomy motivated him to visit and perform there.

On June 20, 2019, Ma performed the Bach Complete Cello Suites in plein air at Jay Pritzker Pavilion in Chicago, Illinois. The free performance attracted what might have been his largest audience, with a pavilion capacity of 11,000, and many thousands more listening from surrounding Millennium Park.

On January 20, 2021, Ma's performance of "Amazing Grace"—pre-recorded due to the COVID-19 pandemic—was played during the inauguration of Joe Biden. In March 2021, Ma played "Ave Maria" in an impromptu waiting room concert, after receiving his second dose of a COVID-19 vaccine at Berkshire Community College in Massachusetts.

On September 14, 2021, Ma again performed Bach's six cello suites at the Hollywood Bowl, this time without intermission, pausing only briefly for applause between suites, and to announce his dedications for two of them.

Media appearances
Ma appeared as himself in an episode ("My Music Rules") of the animated children's television series Arthur, and on The West Wing (the episode "Noël"), where he played the prelude to Bach's Cello Suite No.1 at a Congressional Christmas party. He made five appearances on Sesame Street, all of which first aired during the show's 17th season in 1986. He appeared in The Simpsons episode "Puffless", where he played a serenade and theme music. Ma's likeness appeared in another Simpsons episode, "Missionary: Impossible", but he was played by regular Simpsons cast member Hank Azaria rather than Ma himself. Ma appeared twice on Mister Rogers' Neighborhood, developed a friendship with creator and host Fred Rogers, and later received the inaugural Fred Rogers Legacy Award.

He also starred in the visual accompaniment to his recordings of Bach's Six Suites for Unaccompanied Cello.

Ma was often invited to press events by Apple Inc. and Pixar CEO Steve Jobs, performed during the company's major events, and appeared in a commercial for the Macintosh computer. Ma's Bach recordings were used in a memorial video released by Apple on the first anniversary of Jobs's death.

Ma was a guest on the "Not My Job" segment of Wait Wait... Don't Tell Me! on April 7, 2007, where he won for listener Thad Moore.

On October 27, 2008, Ma appeared as a guest and performer on The Colbert Report. He was also one of the show's guests on November 1, 2011, where he performed songs from the album The Goat Rodeo Sessions with musicians Stuart Duncan, Edgar Meyer and Chris Thile. He also performed several of Bach's cello suites for the 2012 film Bill W. On October 5, 2015, he appeared on Colbert's new program, The Late Show with Stephen Colbert, in support of ballerina Misty Copeland, and prematurely celebrating his 60th birthday.

In August 2018, Ma appeared on NPR's Tiny Desk Concerts.

On June 19, 2020, the same group of musicians who recorded The Goat Rodeo Sessions released a second album, Not Our First Goat Rodeo.

On September 1, 2020, the same group performed a virtual concert of some songs from Not Our First Goat Rodeo on NPR's Tiny Desk Concerts.

On June 13, 2021, Ma was the guest on BBC Radio 4's Desert Island Discs. His musical choices included "Tin Tin Deo" by the Oscar Peterson Trio and "Podmoskovnye Vechera - Moscow Nights" by Vasily Solovyov-Sedoi. He selected as his book the 24 volumes of the Encyclopædia Britannica, and as his luxury item a Swiss Army knife. He revealed that his career in music felt like a "gift" after scoliosis threatened his ability to play in his 20s.

Ma makes a cameo appearance as himself in the 2022 Netflix film Glass Onion: A Knives Out Mystery.

Personal life
Since 1978, Ma has been married to Jill Hornor, an arts consultant. They have two children, Nicholas and Emily. Although he personally considers it the "worst epithet he's ever faced", he was "tagged" in 2001 as "Sexiest Classical Musician" by People. He has continued to receive such accolades over the years, including from AARP in 2012. He has also been praised as a person of unquestionable character, and singled out for his humble spirit, self-effacing manner, and humanitarianism.

According to research presented by Henry Louis Gates Jr. for the PBS series Faces of America, a relative hid the Ma family genealogy in his home in China to save it from destruction during the Cultural Revolution. Ma's paternal ancestry can be traced back 18 generations to the year 1217. The genealogy was compiled in the 18th century by an ancestor, tracing everyone with the surname Ma, through the paternal line, back to one common ancestor in the 3rd century BC. Ma's generation name, Yo, was decided by his fourth great grand-uncle, Ma Ji Cang, in 1755. DNA research revealed that Ma is distantly related to actress Eva Longoria.

Aside from English, Ma is fluent in Mandarin Chinese and French.

Discography

Ma's albums include recordings of cello concertos (including, among others, Shostakovich, Brahms, Elgar, and Haydn), sonatas for cello and piano, Bach's cello suites, and a variety of chamber music. He has also recorded in non-classical styles, notably in collaboration with Bobby McFerrin, Chris Botti, Carlos Santana, James Taylor, and Chris Thile.

Awards and recognition
Grammy Award
Grammy Award for Best Chamber Music Performance:
1986 Brahms: Cello and Piano Sonatas in E Minor Op. 38, and F Op. 99 (RCA 17022)
1987 Beethoven: Cello and Piano Sonata No. 4 in C & Variations (CBS 42121)
1992 Brahms: Piano Quartets Op. 25, Op. 26 (Sony 45846)
1993 Brahms: Sonatas for Cello & Piano (Sony 48191)
1996 Brahms/Beethoven/Mozart: Clarinet Trios (Sony 57499)
Grammy Award for Best Instrumental Soloist(s) Performance:
1990 Barber: Cello Concerto, Op. 22/Britten: Symphony for Cello and Orchestra, Op. 68 (CBS 44900)
1993 Prokofiev: Sinfonia Concertante/Tchaikovsky: Variations on a Rococo Theme (Sony 48382)
1995 The New York Album – Works of Albert, Bartók & Bloch (Sony 57961)
1998 Yo-Yo Ma Premieres – Danielpour, Kirchner, Rouse (Sony Classical 66299)
Grammy Award for Best Instrumental Soloist Performance:
1985 Bach: The Unaccompanied Cello Suites (CBS 37867)
Grammy Award for Best Classical Contemporary Composition:
1995 The New York Album, Stephen Albert: Cello Concerto (Sony 57961)
Grammy Award for Best Classical Album:
1998 Yo-Yo Ma Premieres – Danielpour, Kirchner, Rouse (Sony Classical 66299)
Grammy Award for Best Classical Crossover Album:
1999 Soul of the Tango – The Music of Astor Piazzolla (Sony Classical 63122)
2001 Appalachian Journey (Sony 66782)
2004 Obrigado Brazil (Sony 89935)
2009 Songs of Joy & Peace (Sony Classical B001BN1V8U)
Grammy Award for Best Folk Album:
2012 The Goat Rodeo Sessions w/ Stuart Duncan, Edgar Meyer & Chris Thile
Grammy Award for Best World Music Album:
2017 Sing Me Home – Yo-Yo Ma & The Silk Road Ensemble
Grammy Award for Best Chamber Music/Small Ensemble Performance:
2022 Beethoven: Cello Sonatas - Hope and Tears – Yo-Yo Ma & Emanuel Ax

Honorary doctorates 

 1991: Honorary Doctor of Music, Harvard University
 2005: Honorary Doctor of Musical Arts, Princeton University
 2019: Honorary Doctor of Music, University of Oxford
2019: Honorary Doctor of Arts, Dartmouth College
2022: Honorary Doctor of Music, Stony Brook University
2022: Honorary Doctor of Music, Columbia University
Others
1978: Avery Fisher Prize
1993: Member of the American Academy of Arts and Sciences
1999: The Glenn Gould Prize
1999: Member of the American Philosophical Society
2001: National Medal of Arts
2004: Harvard Arts Medal
2004: Latin Grammy for Best Instrumental Album at the 2004 Latin Grammy Awards for Obrigado Brazil (Sony 89935)
2006: Dan David Prize
2006: Léonie Sonning Music Prize
2007: Award of Distinction at the International Cello Festival
2011: Kennedy Center Honor
2011: Presidential Medal of Freedom awarded on February 15, 2011 
2012: Polar Music Prize
2012: Best Cross-Cultural Collaboration Award by Songlines magazine's 2012 annual Songlines Music Awards, for his work The Goat Rodeo Sessions with Stuart Duncan, Edgar Meyer and Chris Thile
2013: Vilcek Prize in Contemporary Music
2014: Midwest Young Artists Golden Baton Award
2014: Fred Rogers Legacy Award, inaugural recipient, given by the Fred Rogers Center for Early Learning and Children's Media at Saint Vincent College. Upon reception of the award, Ma stated, "This is perhaps the greatest honor I've ever received."
2016: Commander of the Order of Arts and Letters
2020: The Asia Society Asia Game Changer Award
2021: Praemium Imperiale
2022: Birgit Nilsson Prize

References

External links

 
 
 Yo-Yo Ma at Sony Classical
 Yo-Yo Ma's gear at Gearboard
 
 
 

 

1955 births
20th-century American male musicians
20th-century American musicians
21st-century American male musicians
21st-century American musicians
American classical cellists
American classical musicians of Chinese descent
Asia Game Changer Award winners
Canadian Screen Award winners
Child classical musicians
Columbia University alumni
Commandeurs of the Ordre des Arts et des Lettres
Contemporary classical music performers
Emmy Award winners
Fellows of the American Academy of Arts and Sciences
French emigrants to the United States
French people of Chinese descent
Glenn Gould Prize winners
Grammy Award winners
Harvard College alumni
Honorary Members of the Royal Academy of Music
Juilliard School alumni
Kennedy Center honorees
Latin Grammy Award winners
Living people
Members of Committee of 100
Members of the American Philosophical Society
Musicians from Cambridge, Massachusetts
Musicians from New York City
Musicians from Paris
PBS people
People from Belmont, Massachusetts
Presidential Medal of Freedom recipients
Recipients of the Léonie Sonning Music Prize
Sony Classical Records artists
United Nations Messengers of Peace
United States National Medal of Arts recipients
20th-century cellists
21st-century cellists